Hugo Stiglitz López, better known simply as Hugo Stiglitz, (born August 28, 1940, in Mexico City) is a Mexican actor.

Stiglitz is perhaps most well known for his film roles in the 1970s and 1980s in Mexico in such horror films as Tintorera and Night of a 1000 Cats. He also filmed several movies in Hollywood (Under the Volcano) and Italy (Nightmare City). Quentin Tarantino paid a tribute to him by naming a character "Hugo Stiglitz" (played by actor Til Schweiger) in the film Inglourious Basterds.

Selected filmography 

 Las fieras (1969) as Tony
 Macho Callahan (1970) as Man #1
 Las figuras de arena (1970)
 Robinson Crusoe (1969) as Robinson Crusoe
 Nido de fieras (1971)
 Los desalmados (1971)
 Bang bang... al hoyo (1971)
 Night of a 1000 Cats (1972) as Hugo
 Vanessa (1972) as Alex
  (1972) as Morgan
 Pilotos de combate (1973)
 El juez de la soga (1973) as Kirk Morgan
 Robinson y Viernes en la isla encantada (1973) as Robinson Crusoe
 Uno para la horca (1973) as Anthony Trevor
 El señor de Osanto (1974)
 El llanto de la tortuga (1975) as Héctor
 El valle de los miserables (1975) as Felipe Aguirre
 Viaje fantástico en globo (1975) as Professor Fergusson
 Sobrevivientes de los Andes (1976) as Francisco
 Longitud de guerra (1976) as San José
 Tintorera (1977) as Steven
 El rey de los gorilas (1977) as Ape
 The Bermuda Triangle (1978) as Capt. Mark Briggs
 Los pequeños privilegios (1978) as Hugo
 Cyclone (1978) as Pilot
 Oro rojo (1978) as Víctor
 Mil millas al sur (1978) as Dany Montero
 Lo blanco, lo rojo y lo negro (1979)
 Bloody Marlene (1979) as Jim McCutchen
 Guyana: Crime of the Century (1979) as Cliff Robson
 Traficantes de pánico (1980) as Captain Sylvester
 En mil pedazos (1980) as Jorge Sueiro
 Nightmare City (1980) as Dean Miller
 Fabricantes de pánico (1980)
 El fantasma del lago (1981) as don Gonzalo Ruiz
 357 magnum (1981)
  (1980) as Theo
 Black Jack (aka Asalto al casino) (1981) as Police Commissioner Angel Carvenas
  (1984) as Koldo
 Under the Volcano (1984) as Sinarquista
 Treasure of the Amazon (1985) as Riverboat Captain
 Cementerio del terror (1985) as Dr. Cardan
 Masacre en el río Tula (1985) as El Man
 Rosa de la frontera (1985)
 El escuadrón de la muerte (1985) as Sergio Enriquez
 El día de los Albañiles II (1985)
 Cuando corrio el alazan (1985)
 Matanza en Matamoros (1986)
 La muerte de un pistolero (1986)
 Policia judicial federal (1987)
 Los verduleros II (1987) as The Killer
 Mauro el mojado (1987) as Johnny Ventura
 Traficantes de cocaina (1987)
 Sueño de Tony (1987)
 Mente asesina (1987)
 Con el odio en la piel (1988)
 Counterforce (1988) as The Blond
 Los gatos de las azoteas (1988) as El Adivino
 El placer de la venganza (1988)
 La noche de la bestia (1988) as Willi
 La gallera (1988)
 Durazo, la verdadera historia (1988)
 AR-15: Comando implacable (1988)
 3 lancheros muy picudos (1989) as Hugo
 Open Fire (1989) as Don Gaspar
 Hasta que la muerte nos separe (1989) as Orlando
 El loco Bronco (1989) as Virgilio Rojas
 El pájaro con suelas (1989) as César
 El diario íntimo de una cabaretera (1989) as Marcelo
 Traficante por ambición (1989) as Capitan Gordon
 Seducción y muerte (1989)
 La mafia tiembla II (1989)
 Bonampak (1989)
 Aventuras que matan (1989)
 Asalto en la frontera (1989)
 El inocente y las pecadoras (1990)
 Keiko en peligro (1990)
 Noche de pánico (1990)
 Noche de fieras (1990) as Ernesto
 El protector de la mafia (1990)
 Comando de federales (1990) as Comandante Aguila
 Cargas prohibidas (1990)
 Camarena vive (1990)
 El 30-30 (1991)
 Mujer de cabaret (1991) as Don Lalo
 Trágico carnaval (1991)
 Secuestro equivocado (1991)
 La ley de la mafia (1991) as El comandante
 Escuadrón suicida (1991)
 Armas, robo y muerte (1991)
 Alarido del terror (1991) as Roberto
 Tequila (1992)
 Corrupción encadenada (1992)
 Más allá del deseo (1992) as Juan
 La dama y el judicial (1992)
 Imperio blanco (1992) as Comandante Victor
 Cobra silenciosa (1992)
 Camaleon: Atentado a Castro (1992)
 Perseguido (1993) as Teniente Aquiles
 Obligado a matar (1993) as Victor
 La voz de los caracoles (1993) as comandante Drako
 Entre el poder y el deseo (1993) as Quintana
 Frontera Sur (1993) as Aguila
 Chicas en peligro (1993)
 Bulldog (1993) as Muriel
 Las esmeraldas son sangre (1994)
 Mujeres infieles (1995) as Eduardo
 Leyendas de amor y muerte (1995)
 El arrecife de los Alacranes (1995) as Capitán Elias
 Pueblo de violencia (1995) as Jesús Morones
 Magnicídio (1995)
 Las nieves de enero (1995)
 La fuga de los Pérez (1995)
 Crímenes de pasión (1995) as Roldán Carmona
 La mujer de los dos (1996) as Francisco
 Víctimas de la ambición (1996) as Lic. Ordoñez
 La juez Lobo (1996)
 Una luz en la oscuridad (1997)
 El último cazador (1997)
 El asesinato (1997) as Marcelo / Abogado
 Naked Lies (1998) as Santiago
 El culebrero (1998) as El Griego
 Unidos por el destino (1998) as Colombiano
 Perro de cadena (1998)
 El bronco negro (1998)
 Cazador de soplones (1998) as Hector del Valle
 Cazador de cazadores (1998) as Ermitano
 Bajadores de narcos (1998) as Mr. Mulata
 Angeluz (1998) as Dr. Vera
 2 monjitas en peligro (1998)
 Crisis (1998)
 Sonora y sus ojos negros (1999)
 Siete millones (1999)
 Pollitas de cuenta (1999)
 Polícia de narcóticos 2 (1999)
 Las dos toneladas (1999)
 Informe secreto de la D.E.A. (1999)
 El profeta (1999)
 El mojado fracasado (1999) as Ernesto Quintero
 El heredero (1999)
 El comerciante (1999)
 Polifemo (2000, Short) as The Cyclop Polifemo (voice)
 Los 2 compas (2000)
 La avioneta amarilla (2000)
 El regreso de las cobras negras (2000)
 The Pearl (2001) as Beggar One
 Perros de pelea (2001)
 La fiera de la montaña (2001) as El abuelo
 El vengador de cabrones (2001)
 El corrido del hijo de Simon Blanco (2001)
 Chinango (2002)
 Simón, el gran varón (2002) as Benito
 La tragedia de Lamberto Quintero (2002)
 El tuerto de la sierra (2002)
 El nuevo corrido de Arnulfo Gonzalez (2002)
 El corrido del comandante Macario Leyba (2002)
 Seis días en la oscuridad (2003) as Prof. Hernandez
 Viva Villa Cabrones (2003)
 El corrido de Valente Quintero (2003)
 Dos gallos de Guanajuato (2003)
 Para Matar a un Asesino/To Kill a Killer (2003)
 Naturaleza muerta (2003)
 Las pasiones de sor Juana (2004) as Don Rodrigo
 La diosa del mar (2005) as Baltazar Ojeda
 Emiliano Cadena: El méxicano 2 (2007)
 Chinango (2009) as Licenciado Mendez
 Cielo rojo (2011, TV Series) as Gonzalo Molina
 El Hombre de Negro II (2013) as Don Evaristo Juárez
 Instructions Not Included (2013) as Johnny Bravo
 El diario de una prostituta (2013) as Tom Wells
 Los Tres Hacendados (2015) as Alvaro
 Con mis propias manos (2015) as Don Esteban
 Señora acero la coyote (2016, TV Series) as Carlos Delgado
 Mas Que Buitre (2016) as Comandante Roman Rios
 El ocaso del cazador (2017)
 El Ondeado: ¿Héroe o villano? (2017) as Hernan
 Secuestro Anonimo (2017) as Comandante
 American Curious (2018) as Abraham Silva
 El Complot Mongol (2018) as Hugo Stiglitz
 Un sentimiento honesto en el calabozo del olvido (2019) as Abir Benacerraf

References

External links 

Profile on Cinefania site.

1940 births
Living people
Mexican male film actors
Male actors from Mexico City
Mexican people of German descent